Adriana Biagiotti (born 19 July 1947) is a retired Italian gymnast. She competed at the 1968 Olympics in all artistic gymnastics events with the best result of 39th place on the vault.

References

External links
 

1947 births
Living people
Gymnasts at the 1968 Summer Olympics
Olympic gymnasts of Italy
Italian female artistic gymnasts